A total lunar eclipse occurred on 21 January 2019 UTC (Coordinated Universal Time).  For observers in the Americas, the eclipse took place between the evening of Sunday, 20 January and the early morning hours of Monday, 21 January. For observers in Europe and Africa, the eclipse occurred during the morning of 21 January. The Moon was near its perigee on 21 January and as such can be described as a "supermoon".

As this supermoon was also a wolf moon (the first full moon in a calendar year), it was referred to as a "super blood wolf moon"; blood refers to the typical red color of the Moon during a total lunar eclipse. This was the last total lunar eclipse until May 2021. This was a Super Full Moon because occurred less than a day before perigee and the Moon was less than exactly 360,000 km (223,694 mi).

The Griffith Observatory in Los Angeles, California captured video showing a meteor between the size of an acorn and tennis ball impacting the moon during the eclipse. The impact was observed during totality, at 4:41 UTC, on left side of the moon. It is the only documented case of a lunar impact during a total lunar eclipse.

Visibility 

The eclipse was visible in its entirety from North and South America, as well as portions of western Europe and northwest Africa. From locations in North America, the eclipse began during the evening hours of January 20. Observers at locations in Europe and much of Africa were able to view part of the eclipse before the Moon set in the early morning (pre-dawn) hours of January 21.

Timing 

The penumbral phases of the eclipse changes the appearance of the Moon only slightly and is generally not noticeable.

Observations

America

Europe

Appearance 
It took place in the constellation of Cancer, just west of the Beehive Cluster.

Impact sighted 

Livestreams detected a flash of light while viewing the eclipse.  It was "likely caused by the crash of a tiny, fast-moving meteoroid left behind by a comet."

Originally thinking it was electronic noise from the camera, astronomers and citizen scientists shared the visual phenomenon with each other to identify it.

When totality was just beginning at 4:41 UT, the tiny speck of light blinked south of a nearly 55-mile-wide crater in the western part of the moon.

The location of the impact may be somewhere in the lunar highlands, south of Byrgius crater, according to Justin Cowart, a graduate student in geosciences at Stony Brook University in New York who first saw the flash of light.

“A meteoroid about this size hits the moon about once a week or so,” said Cowart.

This may be the first time that a collision, during a total lunar eclipse, was captured on video.

“I have not heard of anyone seeing an impact like this during a lunar eclipse before,” said Sara Russell, a professor of planetary sciences at the Natural History Museum in London.

People posted their images and video of a flicker of light as news spread quickly on social media.

Working overtime, co-director of the Moon Impacts Detection and Analysis System, MIDAS, an astrophysicist at the University of Huelva in Spain, Jose Maria Madiedo, set up eight telescopes to watch for any impacts during the eclipse.

“Something inside of me told me that this time would be the time,” said Madiedo.

A paper calculated a mass between 20 and 100 kilograms and diameter of 30 to 50 cm that may have caused a 7–15 meter crater located "inside a triangle with vertices in the Lagrange H, K and X craters". Other astronomers estimated a 10-15 meter crater from a 45 kg asteroid moving 61,000 km/h.

Related eclipses

Eclipses of 2019 
 A partial solar eclipse on 6 January.
 A total lunar eclipse on 21 January.
 A total solar eclipse on 2 July.
 A partial lunar eclipse on 16 July.
 An annular solar eclipse on 26 December.

Lunar year series

Saros series 
It is part of Saros cycle 134.

Half-Saros cycle 
A lunar eclipse will be preceded and followed by solar eclipses by 9 years and 5.5 days (a half saros). This lunar eclipse is related to two annular solar eclipses of Solar Saros 141.

More details 

Penumbral Magnitude = 2.16972 (216.972%)

Umbral Magnitude = 1.19657 (119.657%)

Gamma = 0.36842 (36.945%)

Epsilon = 0.3763° (0°22’34.68”)

Greatest Eclipse = 2019 Jan 21 at 05:12:18.0 UTC

Ecliptic Opposition = 2019 Jan 21 at 05:16:04.9 UTC

Equatorial Opposition = 2019 Jan 21 at 05:07:42.5 UTC

Sun’s Equatorial Right Ascension = 20.205h

Sun’s Equatorial Declination = -19.96°

Sun’s Apparent Diameter = 1950.4 arcseconds

Sun’s Equatorial Horizontal Parallax = 17.8 arcseconds

Moon’s Equatorial Right Ascension = 8.208h

Moon’s Equatorial Declination = +20.34°

Moon’s Apparent Diameter = 2004.2 arcseconds

Moon’s Equatorial Horizontal Parallax = 7355.8 arcseconds

Earth’s Shadow’s Equatorial Right Ascension = 8.205h

Earth’s Shadow’s Equatorial Declination = +19.96°

Earth’s Penumbral Shadow Diameter = 9424.8 arcseconds

Earth’s Umbral Shadow Diameter = 5523.84 arcseconds

Saros = 134 (27 of 73)

Orbital Node = Ascending Node

Moon’s Distance = 357,718 km (222,276 mi)

See also 
List of lunar eclipses and List of 21st-century lunar eclipses

References

External links
 
 Hermit eclipse: 2019-01-21
 Eclipse information from skyandtelescope.com, including timing in different time zones

2019-01
2019 in science
January 2019 events